The 1948 William & Mary Indians football team represented William & Mary during the 1948 college football season. The William & Mary Indians finished the regular season ranked #17 in the AP Poll after their 9–0 win over Arkansas. Also notably, Indians tied #3 North Carolina, 7–7, in Chapel Hill.

Schedule

NFL Draft selections

References

William and Mary
William & Mary Tribe football seasons
William